"The Wish" is the ninth episode of season three of Buffy the Vampire Slayer. It was written by Marti Noxon, directed by David Greenwalt, and first broadcast on December 8, 1998.

Although a standalone episode, "The Wish" is considered one of the best episodes of the show.

Plot
Cordelia returns to school only to be rejected by Harmony and her former clique, who taunt her as "Xander's castoff". She goes to The Bronze where Buffy accidentally humiliates her further by knocking her into a pile of trash in front of her friends. Cordelia decides that Buffy is to blame for her predicament.

The next day, new girl Anya gives Cordelia an amulet while trying to goad her into wishing something bad would happen to Xander. Instead Cordelia wishes that Buffy had never come to Sunnydale. Anya immediately transforms into Anyanka, the vengeance demon of scorned and wronged women, and grants the wish.

Cordelia is once again popular in school, her Cordettes are at her beck and call, and handsome jock John Lee wants to date her. Her happiness is short lived when she realises that the town is overrun by vampires. The Master has risen and created a vast army of vampires, which terrorize the surviving humans. Most of the students are either dead or vampires and there is a nighttime curfew. Walking through the streets at night Cordelia encounters Xander and Willow who are now aggressive, capricious vampires. She is saved by a group of vampire fighters led by Giles. Cordelia tries to explain to Giles what happened and asks to have Buffy back so that things could be the way they were; but, before she can elaborate, she is killed by Xander and Willow.

Giles calls Buffy's contacts in Cleveland but is able only to leave a message for the very busy Slayer. He learns that the amulet Cordelia was wearing is that of Anyanka, whose granted wishes can be undone only if her center of power is destroyed.

The Master has created machinery to industrialize harvesting of blood from captive humans. Giles, on his way home, is nearly captured by vampires who are rounding up humans for the plant; he is rescued by Buffy, the slayer, who in this reality is cold and cynical. She doubts that Giles can reverse Anya's spell, but does offer to kill the Master. Buffy finds Angel imprisoned; when she sees that he is a vampire, she initially rejects his help, but the marks of torture on his chest persuade her that he is no friend of the Master.

The Master starts up the plant with the first human victim before a cage of prisoners, including Oz and Larry. Buffy and Angel attack the vampires. During the battle, Xander kills Angel, Buffy kills Xander, Oz kills Willow, and the Master breaks Buffy's neck.

Meanwhile, Giles uses a spell to summon Anyanka to his house. He guesses that Anyanka's own amulet is the center of her powers and smashes it, restoring the original reality. Cordelia once again makes the wish and Anyanka tries to grant it, but without her amulet she is powerless.

Reception
Rhonda Wilcox and David Lavery described "The Wish" as "one of the darkest of Buffy episodes. The moment Vamp Xander and Vamp Willow kill Cordelia-without remorse and with visible pleasure-the tone of the episode shifts, climaxing in the scene where the cast regulars are killed in slow motion and with haunting music underneath."

Matthew Pateman praised the performance of Mark Metcalf as the Master. He also points out the satire involved in the Master's plan to mechanize the draining of blood, its implicit criticism of progress through mass production, and the script's reference to Aldous Huxley's novel Brave New World where such themes are explored.

Lewis Call said the episode was a "multi-signifying masterpiece". In "Bewitched, Bothered and Bewildered", an earlier episode also written by Marti Noxon, a love-struck Willow responds to Xander's threat to use force with an enthusiastic "Force is OK!". Call writes that this indicates a character trait in Willow that is brought to the fore in "The Wish" where she is portrayed as polymorphously perverse and sadomasochistic.

References

External links

 
 "The Wish" at BuffyGuide.com

1998 American television episodes
Alternate history television episodes
Buffy the Vampire Slayer (season 3) episodes
Television episodes about parallel universes
Television episodes about mass murder
Television episodes about human trafficking
Television episodes written by Marti Noxon